Ka'ak (also transliterated kaak) or kahqa is the common Arabic word for biscuit, in its various senses, and can refer to several different types of baked goods produced throughout the Arab world and the Near East. The bread, in Middle Eastern countries, is similar to a dry and hardened biscuit and mostly ring-shaped. Similar pastry, called "kue kaak", is also popular in Indonesia.

History
Ka'ak is first attested to in the Kitab al Wusla il al Habib, which originates from Syria in the 13th century.   The Kitab al Wusla il al Habib gives three recipes for Ka'ak.

Variations

Bread rings

Ka'ak can refer to a bread commonly consumed throughout the Near East that is made in a large ring-shape and is covered with sesame seeds. Fermented chickpeas are used as a leavening agent. Widely sold by street vendors, it is usually eaten as a snack or for breakfast with za'atar. In East Jerusalem, it is sometimes served alongside oven-baked eggs and falafel. Palestinians from Hebron to Jenin consider ka'ak al-Quds (Jerusalem ka'ak)  to be a unique specialty good, and those from the city or visiting there often buy several loaves to give to others outside the city as a gift.

In Lebanon, ka'ak bread rings are made of sweet dough rolled into ropes and formed into rings and topped with sesame seeds. Instead of za'atar, after baking, it is glazed with milk and sugar and then dried. Tunisian Jews also make a slightly sweet-and-salty version of the pastry, but don't use a yeast-based dough. In Egypt, usually at wedding parties, a variation made with almonds, known as kahk bi loz, is served.

A thirteenth-century Middle Eastern culinary text, Kitab al Wusla il al Habib, features three recipes of ka'ak.

Sweets

In some societies, the pastries or sweets known as ka'ak are semolina-based cookies (biscuits) such as ka'ak bi ma'moul (or ka'ak bi ajwa) which is stuffed with ground dates, ka'ak bi jowz which is stuffed with ground walnuts and ka'ak bi fustok which is stuffed with ground pistachios.

Ka'ak are popularly served for Eid al-Fitr and Easter in Egypt, where they are known as kahk. Kahk are coated in powdered sugar and filled with ‘agameya (عجمية, a mixture of honey, nuts, and ghee), lokum, walnuts, pistachios, or dates, or simply served plain. They are also decorated with intricate designs. Egyptians have made kahk since the Eighteenth Dynasty of Ancient Egypt, 3500 years ago.

Arab Christians, primary among them Palestinian Christians (including those who live in the Palestinian diaspora) and Lebanese Christians, make these sweets to celebrate Easter. The pastries are often shaped as wreaths and symbolize the crown of thorns that Christians believe Jesus of Nazareth was wearing on the day of his crucifixion.

For the Muslim feasts during Eid al-Fitr and Eid al-Adha, ka'ak bi ma'moul is a traditional dessert as well. In Gaza, when a neighbour sends a dish filled with food to your house as is often the case during the holidays, it is customary to return the dish filled with food of your own making, and most commonly with ka'ak bi ajwa. The ka'ak sweets are also made year round among the entire Palestinian population and flour is sometimes substituted for semolina.

Ka'ak al-asfar ("the yellow roll") is a cake of bread that is made by Muslims in the Levant to honour the souls of the departed. Traditionally, this bread, stamped with an elaborate geometric design, was distributed along with dried fruit to the poor, to children, and to relatives, by the family of the deceased on the Thursday and Monday following the death and on a day known as Khamis al-Amwat ("Thursday of the Dead"). A bread stamp that was used to imprint designs on these cakes was discovered in Palestine and dates back to the fourteenth or fifteenth century CE. It is round, with a round handle and geometric designs, and measures 19 centimeters in diameter.

Ka'ak sweets made by Iraqis are generally doughnut-shaped and covered in sesame seeds, such as ka'ak ab sumsum and ka'ak eem tzmukin, which has raisins among other ingredients. Ka'ak beharat oo tefach shares the shape and many of the same ingredients as ka'ak eem tzmukin, but substitutes apples for raisins and is coated in almonds instead of sesame seeds. In Yemen, ka'ak was traditionally made with a sparse additive of black cumin (Nigella sativa). Ka'ak was the traditional pastry eaten by the Jews of Yemen during the feast of Purim.

See also
Bagel
Bublik
Bucellarii
Simit

References

Bibliography

Egyptian cuisine
Iraqi cuisine
Jordanian cuisine
Israeli cuisine
Lebanese cuisine
Cypriot cuisine
Levantine cuisine
Mediterranean cuisine
Palestinian cuisine
Saudi Arabian cuisine
Syrian cuisine
Yemeni cuisine
Arabic words and phrases
Sesame seed breads
Moroccan pastry